Haim Ziskind (born June 14, 1990 in Haifa, Israel) is an Israeli footballer who plays for Maccabi Bnei Reineh.

Career
Ziskind began his career with Maccabi Haifa and is the 3rd choice goalkeeper of the Ligat Toto team.

Honours

Youth 
 Israel Youth Club League
 Winner (1): 2008-2009

References

1990 births
Israeli Jews
Living people
Israeli footballers
Maccabi Haifa F.C. players
Hapoel Herzliya F.C. players
Ironi Tiberias F.C. players
Hapoel Beit She'an F.C. players
F.C. Haifa Robi Shapira players
Hapoel Umm al-Fahm F.C. players
Maccabi Bnei Reineh F.C. players
Association football goalkeepers
Footballers from Haifa
Israeli Premier League players
Liga Leumit players
Israeli people of Polish-Jewish descent